Antonio Cabrera was a Paraguayan football defender who played for Paraguay in the 1950 FIFA World Cup. He also played for Club Libertad. Cabrera is deceased.

References

External links

Year of birth missing
Year of death missing
Paraguayan footballers
Paraguay international footballers
Association football defenders
Club Libertad footballers
1950 FIFA World Cup players